"If That Ain't Country" is a debut song co-written and recorded by American country music artist Anthony Smith.  It was released in April 2002 as the first single and title track from the album If That Ain't Country.  The song reached #26 on the Billboard Hot Country Singles & Tracks chart.  The song was written by Smith and Jeffrey Steele.

Chart performance

References

2002 debut singles
2002 songs
Anthony Smith (singer) songs
Songs written by Anthony Smith (singer)
Songs written by Jeffrey Steele
Mercury Records singles